"A New Machine", parts 1 and 2 are songs from Pink Floyd's 1987 album, A Momentary Lapse of Reason.

Lyrics and music
They serve as bookends to the instrumental track "Terminal Frost", and feature David Gilmour's voice, electrically distorted, through a vocoder and a rising synth note. The narrator seems to express weariness with a lifetime spent in one body, waiting for the moment of death, but seeks consolation in the fact that this "waiting" will eventually end.

The two songs were the first Pink Floyd songs to be credited solely to David Gilmour since "Childhood's End", from their 1972 album Obscured by Clouds.

Personnel
Pink Floyd
David Gilmour – vocals, vocoder, synthesiser, programming

Additional musicians

Patrick Leonard – synthesiser

References

Pink Floyd songs
1987 songs
Rock ballads
Songs about death
Songs written by David Gilmour
Song recordings produced by Bob Ezrin
Song recordings produced by David Gilmour